The Juris Doctor (J.D. or JD), also known as Doctor of Jurisprudence (J.D., JD, D.Jur., or DJur), is a graduate-entry professional degree in law and one of several Doctor of Law degrees. The J.D. is the standard degree obtained to practice law in the United States; unlike in some other jurisdictions, there is no undergraduate law degree in the United States. In the United States, along with Australia, Canada, and some other common law countries, the J.D. is earned by completing law school.

It has the academic standing of a professional doctorate (in contrast to a research doctorate) in the United States, where the National Center for Education Statistics discontinued the use of the term "first professional degree" as of its 2010–2011 data collection and now uses the term "doctor's degree – professional practice". It has the academic standing of a master's degree (extended) in Australia, granted an exception to use "doctor" in the qualification name, and a second-entry baccalaureate degree in Canada.

The degree was first awarded in the United States in the early 20th-century and was created as a modern version of the old European doctor of law degrees, such as the Dottore in Giurisprudenza in Italy, and the Juris Utriusque Doctor in Germany and central Europe. The modern J.D. originates from the 19th-century Harvard movement for the scientific study of law, where it was first denominated an LL.B. In the late 20th century, the awarding of the LL.B. degree was phased out in favour of awarding the J.D. It traditionally involves a three-year program, although some U.S. law schools offer accelerated programs between 2 and 2.5 years. ABA Rules do not allow an accredited J.D. to be obtained in less than 2 years. 

To be fully authorized to practice law in the courts of a given state in the United States, the majority of individuals holding a J.D. degree must pass a bar examination. The state of Wisconsin, however, permits the graduates of its two law schools to practice law in that state, and in its state courts, without having to take its bar exam – a practice called "diploma privilege" – provided they complete all courses required for the diploma. Passing an additional bar exam is not required of lawyers authorized to practice in at least one state in the United States, to practice in some (but not all) of the "federal courts". Lawyers must, however, be admitted to the bar of the federal court before they are authorized to practice in that court. Admission to the bar of a federal district court includes admission to the bar of its associated bankruptcy court. Patent courts however require a specialized "Patent Bar" which require applicants to hold an additional degree specialized in certain scientific fields alongside their J.D.

Etymology and abbreviations
In the United States, the professional doctorate in law may be conferred in Latin or in English as Juris Doctor (sometimes shown on Latin diplomas in the accusative form Juris Doctorem) and at some law schools Doctor of Law (J.D. or JD), or Doctor of Jurisprudence (also abbreviated JD or J.D.). "Juris Doctor" literally means "teacher of law", while the Latin for "Doctor of Jurisprudence" – Jurisprudentiae Doctor – literally means "teacher of legal knowledge".

The J.D. is not to be confused with Doctor of Laws or Legum Doctor (LLD or LL.D.). In institutions where the latter can be earned, e.g., Cambridge University (where it is titled "Doctor of Law", though still retaining the abbreviation LL.D.) and many other British institutions, it is a higher research doctorate, representing a substantial contribution to the field over many years – a standard of professional experience beyond that required for a Ph.D. and academic accomplishment well beyond a professional degree such as the J.D. In the United States, the LL.D. is invariably an honorary degree.

Historical context

Origins of the law degree
The first university in Europe, the University of Bologna, was founded as a school of law by four famous legal scholars in the 11th century who were students of the glossator school in that city. This served as the model for other law schools of the Middle Ages, and other early universities such as the University of Padua. The first academic degrees may have been doctorates in civil law (doctores legum) followed by canon law (doctores decretorum); these were not professional degrees but rather indicated that their holders had been approved to teach at the universities. While Bologna granted only doctorates, preparatory degrees (bachelor's and licences) were introduced in Paris and then in the English universities.

History of legal training in England

The nature of the J.D. can be better understood by a review of the context of the history of legal education in England. The teaching of law at Cambridge and Oxford Universities was mainly for philosophical or scholarly purposes and not meant to prepare one to practice law. The universities only taught civil and canon law (used in a very few jurisdictions, such as the courts of admiralty and church courts) but not the common law that applied in most jurisdictions. Professional training for practicing common law in England was undertaken at the Inns of Court, but over time the training functions of the Inns lessened considerably and apprenticeships with individual practitioners arose as the prominent medium of preparation. However, because of the lack of standardisation of study, and of objective standards for appraisal of these apprenticeships, the role of universities became subsequently important for the education of lawyers in the English-speaking world.

In England in 1292 when Edward I first requested that lawyers be trained, students merely sat in the courts and observed, but over time the students would hire professionals to lecture them in their residences, which led to the institution of the Inns of Court system. The original method of education at the Inns of Court was a mix of moot court-like practice and lecture, as well as court proceedings observation. By the fifteenth century, the Inns functioned like a university, akin to the University of Oxford and the University of Cambridge, though very specialized in purpose. With the frequent absence of parties to suits during the Crusades, the importance of the lawyer role grew tremendously, and the demand for lawyers grew.

Traditionally Oxford and Cambridge did not see common law as worthy of academic study, and included coursework in law only in the context of canon and civil law (the two "laws" in the original Bachelor of Laws, which thus became the Bachelor of Civil Law when the study of canon law was barred after the Reformation) and for the purpose of the study of philosophy or history only. As a consequence of the need for practical education in law, the apprenticeship program for solicitors emerged, structured and governed by the same rules as the apprenticeship programs for the trades. The training of  solicitors by a five-year apprenticeship was formally established by the Attorneys and Solicitors Act 1728. William Blackstone became the first lecturer in English common law at the University of Oxford in 1753, but the university did not establish the program for the purpose of professional study, and the lectures were very philosophical and theoretical in nature. Blackstone insisted that the study of law should be university based, where concentration on foundational principles can be had, instead of concentration on detail and procedure provided by apprenticeship and the Inns of Court.

The 1728 act was amended in 1821 to reduce the period of the required apprenticeship  to three years for graduates in either law or arts from Oxford, Cambridge, and Dublin, as "the admission of such graduates should be facilitated, in consideration of the learning and abilities requisite for taking such degree". This was extended in 1837 to cover the newly established universities of Durham and London, and again in 1851 to include the new Queen's University of Ireland.

The Inns of Court continued but became less effective, and admission to the bar still did not require any significant educational activity or examination. In 1846, Parliament examined the education and training of prospective barristers and found the system to be inferior to that of Europe and the United States, as Britain did not regulate the admission of barristers. Therefore, formal schools of law were called for but were not finally established until later in the century, and even then the bar did not consider a university degree in admission decisions.

Until the mid nineteenth century, most law degrees in England (the BCL at Oxford and Durham, and the LLB at London) were postgraduate degrees, taken after an initial degree in arts. The Cambridge degree, variously referred to as a BCL, BL or LLB, was an exception: it took six years from matriculation to complete, but only three of these had to be in residence, and the BA was not required (although those not holding a BA had to produce a certificate to prove they had not only been in residence but had actually attended lectures for at least three terms). These degrees specialised in Roman civil law rather than in English common law, the latter being the domain of the Inns of Court, and thus they were more theoretical than practically useful. Cambridge reestablished its LLB degree in 1858 as an undergraduate course alongside the BA, and the London LLB, which had previously required a minimum of one year after the BA, become an undergraduate degree in 1866. The older nomenclature continues to be used for the BCL at Oxford today, which is a master's level program, while Cambridge moved its LLB back to being a postgraduate degree in 1922 but only renamed it as the LLM in 1982.

Between the 1960s and the 1990s, law schools in England took on a more central role in the preparation of lawyers and consequently improved their coverage of advanced legal topics to become more professionally relevant. Over the same period, American law schools became more scholarly and less professionally oriented, so that in 1996 Langbein could write: "That contrast between English law schools as temples of scholarship and American law schools as training centers for the profession no longer bears the remotest relation to reality".

Legal training in colonial North America and 19th-century United States

Initially there was much resistance to lawyers in colonial North America because of the role they had played in hierarchical England, but slowly the colonial governments started using the services of professionals trained in the Inns of Court in London, and by the end of the American Revolution there was a functional bar in each state. Due to an initial distrust of a profession open only to the elite in England, as institutions for training developed in what would become the United States they emerged as quite different from those in England.

Initially in the United States the legal professionals were trained and imported from England. A formal apprenticeship or clerkship program was established first in New York in 1730 — at that time a seven-year clerkship was required, and in 1756 a four-year college degree was required in addition to five years of clerking and an examination. Later the requirements were reduced to require only two years of college education. But a system like the Inns did not develop, and a college education was not required in England until the 19th century, so this system was unique.

The clerkship program required much individual study and the mentoring lawyer was expected to carefully select materials for study and guide the clerk in his study of the law and ensure that it was being absorbed. The student was supposed to compile his notes of his reading of the law into a "commonplace book", which he would try to memorize. Although those were the ideals, in reality the clerks were often overworked and rarely were able to study the law individually as expected. They were often employed to tedious tasks, such as making handwritten copies of documents. Finding sufficient legal texts was also a seriously debilitating issue, and there was no standardization in the books assigned to the clerk trainees because they were assigned by their mentor, whose opinion of the law may have differed greatly from his peers.

It was said by one famous attorney in the U.S., William Livingston, in 1745 in a New York newspaper that the clerkship program was severely flawed, and that most mentors
 "have no manner of concern for their clerk's future welfare ... [T]is a monstrous absurdity to suppose, that the law is to be learnt by a perpetual copying of precedents".
There were some few mentors that were dedicated to the service, and because of their rarity, they became so sought-after that the first law schools evolved from the offices of some of these attorneys, who took on many clerks and began to spend more time training than practicing law.

In time, the apprenticeship program was not considered sufficient to produce lawyers fully capable of serving their clients' needs. The apprenticeship programs often employed the trainee with menial tasks, and while they were well trained in the day-to-day operations of a law office, they were generally unprepared practitioners or legal reasoners. The establishment of formal faculties of law in U.S. universities did not occur until the latter part of the 18th century. With the beginning of the American Revolution, the supply of lawyers from Britain ended. The first law degree granted by a U.S. university was a Bachelor of Law in 1793 by the College of William and Mary, which was abbreviated L.B.; Harvard was the first university to use the LL.B. abbreviation in the United States.

The first university law programs in the United States, such as that of the University of Maryland established in 1812, included much theoretical and philosophical study, including works such as the Bible, Cicero, Seneca, Aristotle, Adam Smith, Montesquieu and Grotius. It has been said that the early university law schools of the early 19th century seemed to be preparing students for careers as statesmen rather than as lawyers. At the LL.B. programs in the early 1900s at Stanford University and Yale continued to include "cultural study", which included courses in languages, mathematics and economics. An LL.B., or Bachelor of Laws, recognized that a prior bachelor's degree was not required to earn an LL.B.

In the 1850s there were many proprietary schools which originated from a practitioner taking on multiple apprentices and establishing a school and which provided a practical legal education, as opposed to the one offered in the universities which offered an education in the theory, history and philosophy of law. The universities assumed that the acquisition of skills would happen in practice, while the proprietary schools concentrated on the practical skills during education.

Revolutionary approach: scientific study of law

In part to compete with the small professional law schools, there began a great change in U.S. university legal education. For a short time beginning in 1826 Yale began to offer a complete "practitioners' course" which lasted two years and included practical courses, such as pleading drafting. U.S. Supreme Court justice Joseph Story started the spirit of change in legal education at Harvard, when he advocated a more "scientific study" of the law in the 19th century. At the time he was a lecturer at Harvard. Therefore, at Harvard the education was much of a trade school type of approach to legal education, contrary to the more liberal arts education advocated by Blackstone at Oxford and Jefferson at William and Mary. Nonetheless, there continued to be debate among educators over whether legal education should be more vocational, as at the private law schools, or through a rigorous scientific method, such as that developed by Story and Langdell. In the words of Dorsey Ellis, "Langdell viewed law as a science and the law library as the laboratory, with the cases providing the basis for learning those 'principles or doctrines' of which law, considered as a science, consists. Nonetheless, into the year 1900 most states did not require a university education (although an apprenticeship was often required) and most practitioners had not attended any law school or college.

Therefore, the modern legal education system in the U.S. is a combination of teaching law as a science and a practical skill, implementing elements such as clinical training, which has become an essential part of legal education in the U.S. and in the J.D. program of study.

Creation of the J.D. and major common law approaches to legal education
The J.D. originated in the United States during a movement to improve training of the professions. Prior to the origination of the J.D., law students began law school either with only a high school diploma, or less than the amount of undergraduate study required to earn a bachelor's degree. The LL.B. persisted through the middle of the 20th century, after which a completed bachelor's degree became a requirement for virtually all students entering law school. The didactic approaches that resulted were revolutionary for university education and have slowly been implemented outside the U.S., but only recently (since about 1997) and in stages. The degrees which resulted from this new approach, such as the M.D. and the J.D., are just as different from their European counterparts as the educational approaches differ.

Legal education in the United States

Professional doctorates were developed in the United States in the 19th century, the first being the Doctor of Medicine in 1807, but at the time, the legal system in the United States was still in development as the educational institutions were developing, and the status of the legal profession was at that time still ambiguous and so the professional law degree took more time to develop. Even when some universities offered training in law, they did not offer a degree. Because in the United States there were no Inns of Court, and the English academic degrees did not provide the necessary professional training, the models from England were inapplicable, and the degree program took some time to develop.

At first the degree took the form of a B.L. (such as at the College of William and Mary), but then Harvard, keen on importing legitimacy through the trappings of Oxford and Cambridge, implemented an LL.B. degree. The decision to award a bachelor's degree for law could be due to the fact that admittance to most nineteenth-century American law schools required only satisfactory completion of high school. The degree was nevertheless somewhat controversial at the time because it was a professional training without any of the cultural or classical studies required of a degree in England, where it was necessary to gain a general BA prior to an LLB or BCL until the nineteenth century. Thus, even though the name of the English LL.B. degree was implemented at Harvard, the program in the U.S. was nonetheless intended as a first degree which, unlike the English B.A., gave practical or professional training in law.

Creation of the Juris Doctor

In the mid-19th century there was much concern about the quality of legal education in the United States. C.C. Langdell served as dean of Harvard Law School from 1870 to 1895, and dedicated his life to reforming legal education in the United States. The historian Robert Stevens wrote that "it was Langdell's goal to turn the legal profession into a university educated one — and not at the undergraduate level, but through a three-year post baccalaureate degree." This graduate level study would allow the intensive legal training that Langdell had developed, known as the case method (a method of studying landmark cases) and the Socratic method (a method of examining students on the reasoning of the court in the cases studied). Therefore, a graduate, high-level law degree was proposed: the Juris Doctor, implementing the case and Socratic methods as its didactic approach. According to professor J. H. Beale, an 1882 Harvard Law graduate, one of the main arguments for the change was uniformity. Harvard's four professional schools – theology, law, medicine, and arts and sciences – were all graduate schools, and their degrees were therefore a second degree. Two of them conferred a doctorate and the other two a baccalaureate degree. The change from LL.B. to J.D. was intended to end "this discrimination, the practice of conferring what is normally a first degree upon persons who have already their primary degree". The J.D. was proposed as the equivalent of the German J.U.D., to reflect the advanced study required to be an effective lawyer.

The University of Chicago Law School was the first to offer the J.D. in 1902, when it was just one of five law schools that demanded a college degree from its applicants. While approval was still pending at Harvard, the degree was introduced at many other law schools, including at the law schools at NYU, Berkeley, Michigan, and Stanford. Because of tradition, and concerns about less prominent universities implementing a J.D. program, prominent eastern law schools like those of Harvard, Yale, and Columbia refused to implement the degree. Harvard, for example, refused to adopt the J.D. degree, even though it restricted admission to students with college degrees in 1909. Indeed, pressure from eastern law schools led almost every law school (except at the University of Chicago and other law schools in Illinois) to abandon the J.D. and re‑adopt the LL.B. as the first law degree by the 1930s. By 1962, the J.D. degree was rarely seen outside the Midwest.

After the 1930s, the LL.B. and the J.D. degrees co‑existed in some American law schools. Some law schools, especially in Illinois and the Midwest, awarded both (like Marquette University, beginning in 1926), conferring J.D. degrees only to those with a bachelor's degree (as opposed to two or three years of college before law school), and those who met a higher academic standard in undergraduate studies, finishing a thesis in their third year of law school. Because the J.D. degree was no more advantageous for bar admissions or for employment, the vast majority of Marquette students preferred to seek the LL.B. degree.

As more law students entered law schools with college degrees in the 1950s and 1960s, a number of law schools may have introduced the J.D. to encourage law students to complete their undergraduate degrees. As late as 1961, there were still 15 ABA-accredited law schools in the United States which awarded both LL.B. and J.D. degrees. Thirteen of the 15 were located in the Midwest, which may indicate regional variations in the U.S.

It was only after 1962 that a new push — this time begun at less-prominent law schools — successfully led to the universal adoption of the J.D. as the first law degree. The turning point appears to have occurred when the ABA Section of Legal Education and Admissions to the Bar unanimously adopted a resolution recommending to all approved law schools that they give favorable consideration to the conferring of the J.D. degree as the first professional degree, in 1962 and 1963. By the 1960s, most law students were college graduates, and by the end of that decade, almost all were required to be. Student and alumni support were key in the LL.B.-to-J.D. change, and even the most prominent schools were convinced to make the change: Columbia and Harvard in 1969, and Yale (last) in 1971. Nonetheless, the LL.B. at Yale retained the didactical changes of the "practitioners' courses" of 1826, and was very different from the LL.B. in common law countries, other than Canada.

Following standard modern academic practice, Harvard Law School refers to its Master of Laws and Doctor of Juridical Science degrees as its graduate level law degrees. Similarly, Columbia refers to the LL.M. and the J.S.D. as its graduate program. Yale Law School lists its LL.M., M.S.L., J.S.D., and Ph.D. as constituting graduate programs. A distinction thus remains between professional and graduate law degrees in the United States.

Major common law approaches

The English legal system is the root of the systems of other common-law countries, such as the United States. Originally, common lawyers in England were trained exclusively in the Inns of Court. Even though it took nearly 150 years since common law education began with Blackstone at Oxford for university education to be part of legal training in England and Wales, the LL.B. eventually became the degree usually taken before becoming a lawyer. In England and Wales the LL.B. is an undergraduate scholarly program and although it (assuming it is a qualifying law degree) fulfills the academic requirements for becoming a lawyer, further vocational and professional training as either a barrister (the Bar Professional Training Course followed by pupillage) or as a solicitor (the Legal Practice Course followed by a "period of recognised training") is required before becoming licensed in that jurisdiction. The qualifying law degree in most English universities is the LLB although in some, including Oxford and Cambridge, it is the BA in law. Both of these can  be taken with "senior status" in two years by those already holding an undergraduate degree in another discipline. A few universities offer "exempting" degrees, usually integrated master's degrees denominated Master in Law (MLaw), that combine the qualifying law degree with the legal practice course or the bar professional training course in a four-year, undergraduate-entry program.

Legal education in Canada has unique variations from other Commonwealth countries. Even though the legal system of Canada is mostly a transplant of the English system (Quebec excepted), the Canadian system is unique in that there are no Inns of Court, the practical training occurs in the office of a barrister and solicitor with law society membership, and, since 1889, a university degree has been a prerequisite to initiating an articling clerkship. The education in law schools in Canada was similar to that in the United States at the turn of the 20th century, but with a greater concentration on statutory drafting and interpretation, and elements of a liberal education. The bar associations in Canada were influenced by the changes at Harvard, and were sometimes quicker to nationally implement the changes proposed in the United States, such as requiring previous college education before studying law.

Modern variants and curriculum
Legal education is rooted in the history and structure of the legal system of the jurisdiction where the education is given; therefore, law degrees are vastly different from country to country, making comparisons among degrees problematic. This has proven true in the context of the various forms of the J.D. which have been implemented around the world.

Until about 1997 the J.D. was unique to law schools in the U.S. But with the rise in international success of law firms from the United States, and the rise in students from outside the U.S. attending U.S. law schools, attorneys with the J.D. have become increasingly common internationally. Therefore, the prestige of the J.D. has also risen, and many universities outside the U.S. have started to offer the J.D., often for the express purpose of raising the prestige of their law school and graduates. Such institutions usually aim to appropriate the name of the degree only, and sometimes the new J.D. program of study is the same as that of their traditional law degree, which is usually more scholarly in purpose than the professional training intended with the J.D. as created in the U.S.  Scholarly works are deemed only persuasive, and not binding on the courts. As such, various characteristics can therefore be seen among J.D. degrees as implemented in universities around the world.

{| class="wikitable"
|+ 
|- style="vertical-align:bottom;"
! Jurisdiction
! Scholarlycontentomitted
! Duration
! Differentcurriculum
! Furthertraining
|-  style="text-align:center;"
! Australia
| No || 3 || Yes || Yes
|- style="text-align:center;"
! Canada
| No || 3 || No || Yes
|- style="text-align:center;"
! Hong Kong
| No|| 2–3 || No || Yes
|- style="text-align:center;"
! Japan
| No || 2–3 || Yes || Yes
|- style="text-align:center;"
! Philippines
| No || 4 || Varies || No
|- style="text-align:center;"
! Singapore
| No || 2–3 || No || Yes
|- style="text-align:center;"
!United Kingdom
| No || 3–4 || Yes || Yes
|- style="text-align:center;"
! United States
| Yes || 3 || No || No 
|}

Types and characteristics

Until very recently, only law schools in the United States offered the Juris Doctor. Starting about 1997, universities in other countries began introducing the J.D. as a first professional degree in law, with differences appropriate to the legal systems of the countries in which these law schools are situated.

Standard Juris Doctor curriculum

As stated by James Hall and Langdell, two people who were involved in the creation of the J.D., the J.D. is a professional degree like the M.D., intended to prepare practitioners through a scientific approach of analysing and teaching the law through logic and adversarial analysis (such as the casebook and Socratic methods). It has existed as-described in the United States for over 100 years, and can therefore be termed the 'standard' or 'traditional' J.D. program. The J.D. program generally requires a bachelor's degree for entry, though this requirement is sometimes waived.

The program of study for the degree has remained substantially unchanged since its creation, and is an intensive study of the substantive law and its professional applications (and therefore requires no thesis, although a lengthy writing project is sometimes required
). As a professional training, it provides sufficient training for entry into practice (no apprenticeship is necessary to sit for the bar exam). It requires at least three academic years of full-time study. While the J.D. is a doctoral degree in the US, lawyers usually use the suffix "Esq." as opposed to the prefix "Dr.", and that only in a professional context, when needed to alert others that they are a biased party – acting as an agent for their client.

Replacement for the LL.B.
An initial attempt to rename the LL.B. to the J.D. in the US in the early 20th century started with a petition at Harvard in 1902. This was rejected, but the idea took hold at the new law school established at the University of Chicago and other universities and by 1925 80% of US law schools gave the J.D. to graduate entrants, while restricting undergraduate entrants (who followed the same curriculum) to the LL.B. Yet the change was rejected by Harvard, Yale and Columbia, and by the late 1920s schools were moving away from the J.D. and once again granting only the LL.B, with only law schools in Illinois – the state where the University of Chicago is based – holding out. This changed in the 1960s, by which time almost all law school entrants were graduates. The J.D. was reintroduced in 1962 and by 1971 had replaced the LL.B., again without any change in the curriculum, with many schools going as far as to offer a J.D. to their LL.B. alumni for a small fee.

Canadian and Australian universities have law programs that are very similar to the J.D. programs in the United States. These include Queen's University, Thompson Rivers University, University of British Columbia, University of Alberta, University of Victoria, Université de Moncton, University of Calgary, University of Saskatchewan, University of Manitoba, University of Windsor, University of Ottawa, University of Western Ontario, York University and University of Toronto in Canada, RMIT and the University of Melbourne in Australia.  Therefore, when the J.D. program was introduced at these institutions, it was a mere renaming of their second-entry LL.B. program, and entailed no significant substantive changes to their curricula. The reason given for doing so is because of the international popularity and recognizability of the J.D., and the need to recognise the demanding graduate characteristics of the program.

Because these programs are in institutions heavily influenced by those in Britain, the J.D. programs often have some small scholarly element (see above chart titled Comparisons of J.D. Variants). And because the legal systems are also influenced by that of the Britain, an apprenticeship is still required before being qualified to apply for a license to practice (see country sections below, under "Descriptions of the J.D. outside the U.S.").

Descriptions of the J.D. outside the United States

Australia

The traditional law degree in Australia is the undergraduate Bachelor of Laws (LLB); however, there has been a huge shift towards the JD in the 2010s, with some Australian universities now offering a JD programme, including the country's best ranked universities (e.g. the University of New South Wales, the University of Sydney, the Australian National University, the University of Melbourne and Monash University).

Generally, universities that offer the JD also offer the LLB, though at some universities, only the JD is offered and only at postgraduate levels. Due to recent changes in undergraduate degree structuring, some universities, such as the University of Melbourne, only allow law to be studied at the postgraduate level and the JD has completely replaced the LLB.

An Australian Juris Doctor consists of three years of full-time study, or the equivalent. The course varies across different universities, though all are obliged to teach the Priestley 11 subjects as per the requirements of the state admissions boards in Australia. JDs are considered equivalent to the LLBs and still need to fulfil the same requirements practical legal training for admission as a lawyer.

On the Australian Qualifications Framework, the Juris Doctor is classified as a "masters degree (extended)", with an exception having been granted to use the title Juris Doctor (other such exceptions include Doctor of Medicine, Doctor of Dentistry and Doctor of Veterinary Medicine). It may not be described as a doctoral degree and holders may not use the title "doctor". Along with other extended master's degrees, the JD takes three to four years following a minimum of a three-year bachelor's degree.

Canada
The J.D. degree is the dominant common law law degree in Canada, replacing the traditional LL.B. degree prominent in Commonwealth countries. The University of Toronto became the first to rename its law degree from LL.B. to J.D. in 2001. As with the second-entry LL.B., in order to be admitted to a Juris Doctor program, applicants must have completed a minimum of two or three years of study toward a bachelor's degree and scored high on the North American Law School Admission Test. As a practical matter, nearly all successful applicants have completed one or more degrees before admission to a Canadian common law school, although despite this it is, along with other first professional degrees, considered to be a bachelor's degree-level qualification. All Canadian Juris Doctor programs consist of three years and have similar content in their mandatory first year courses. The mandatory first year courses in Canadian law schools outside Quebec include public law (i.e. provincial law, constitutional law and administrative law), property law, tort law, contract law, criminal law and legal research and writing.

Beyond first year and other courses required for graduation, course selection is elective with various concentrations such as commercial and corporate law, taxation, international law, natural resources law, real estate transactions, employment law, criminal law and Aboriginal law. After graduation from an accredited law school, each province's or territory's law society requires completion of a bar admission course or examination and a period of supervised "articling" prior to independent practice.

Use of the "J.D." designation by Canadian law schools is not intended to indicate an emphasis on American law, but rather to distinguish Canadian law degrees from English law degrees, which do not require prior undergraduate study. The Canadian J.D. is a degree in Canadian law. Accordingly, United States jurisdictions other than New York and Massachusetts do not recognize Canadian Juris Doctor degrees automatically. This is equivalent to the manner in which United States J.D. graduates are treated in Canadian jurisdictions such as Ontario. To prepare graduates to practise in jurisdictions on both sides of the border, some pairs of law schools have developed joint Canadian-American J.D. programs. As of 2018, these include a three-year program conducted concurrently at the University of Windsor and the University of Detroit Mercy, as well as a four-year program with the University of Ottawa and either Michigan State University or American University in which students spend two years studying on each side of the border. Previously, New York University (NYU) Law School and Osgoode Hall Law School offered a similar program, but this has since been terminated.

Two notable exceptions are Université de Montréal and Université de Sherbrooke, which both offer a one-year J.D. program aimed at Quebec civil law graduates in order to practice law either elsewhere in Canada or in the state of New York.

York University offered the degree of Doctor of Jurisprudence (D.Jur.) as a research degree until 2002, when the name of the program was changed to Ph.D. in law.

China
J.D.s are not generally awarded in the People's Republic of China (P.R.C.). Instead, a J.M. (Juris Magister) is awarded as the counterpart of JD in the United States, the professional degree in law in China. The primary law degree in the P.R.C. is the bachelor of law. In the fall of 2008 the Shenzhen campus of Peking University started the School of Transnational Law, which offers a U.S.-style education and awards both a Chinese master's degree and, by special authorization of the government, a J.D.

Hong Kong
The J.D. degree is currently offered at the Chinese University of Hong Kong, The University of Hong Kong, and City University of Hong Kong. The degree is known as the 法律博士 in Chinese and in Cantonese it is pronounced Faat Leot Bok Si. The J.D. in Hong Kong is almost identical to the LL.B., and is reserved for graduates of non-law disciplines, but the J.D. is considered to be a graduate-level degree and requires a thesis or dissertation. Like the LL.B. there is much scholarly content in the required coursework. Although the universities offering the degree claim that the J.D. is a 2-year program, completing the degree in 2 years would require study during the summer term. The JD is, despite its title, considered to be a master's degree by the universities that offer it in Hong Kong, and it is positioned at master's level in the Hong Kong Qualifications Framework.

Neither the LL.B. nor the J.D. provides the education sufficient for a license to practice, as graduates of both are also required to undertake the PCLL course and a solicitor traineeship or a barrister pupillage.

Italy
In Italy the J.D. is known as Laurea Magistrale in Giurisprudenza. In the Bologna process framework, it's a master's-level degree. It comprises 5 years of coursework and a final dissertation. Graduates are awarded the title of "dottore magistrale in giurisprudenza" and are qualified to register to any Italian bar in order to fulfil the 18 months training required to sit the qualification examination.

Japan
The program generally lasts three years. Two year J.D. programs for applicants with legal knowledge (mainly undergraduate level law degree holders) are also offered. This curriculum is professionally oriented, but does not provide the education sufficient for a license to practice as an attorney in Japan, as all candidates for a license must have 12 month practical training by the Legal Training and Research Institute after passing the bar examination.

Mexico
To become a licensed lawyer, a person must hold the Bachelor of Law (Licenciado en Derecho) degree obtainable by four to five years of academic study and final examination. After these undergraduate studies it is possible to obtain a Magister degree (Maestría degree), equivalent to a master's degree. This degree requires two to three years of academic studies. Finally, one can study for an additional three years to obtain the Doctor en Derecho degree, which is a research degree at doctoral level. Since most universities and law schools must have approval from the Secretariat of Public Education (Secretaría de Educación Pública) through the General Office of Professions (Dirección General de Profesiones) all of the academic programs are similar throughout the country in public and private law schools.

Philippines
In the Philippines, the J.D. exists alongside the more common LL.B. Like the standard LL.B., it requires four years of study; is considered a graduate degree and requires prior undergraduate study as a prerequisite for admission and covers the core subjects required for the bar examinations. However, the J.D. requires students to finish the core bar subjects in just 2½ years; take elective courses (such as legal theory, philosophy and sometimes even theology); undergo an apprenticeship; and write and defend a thesis.

The degree was first conferred in the Philippines by the Ateneo de Manila Law School, which first developed the model program later adopted by most schools now offering the J.D. After the Ateneo, schools such as the University of Batangas College of Law, University of St. La Salle – College of Law and the De La Salle Lipa College of Law began offering the J.D., with schools such as the Far Eastern University Institute of Law offering with De La Salle University's Ramon V. Del Rosario College of Business for the country's first J.D. – MBA program. In 2008, the University of the Philippines College of Law began conferring the J.D. on its graduates, the school choosing to rename its LL.B. program into a J.D., to accurately reflect the nature of education the university provides as "nomenclature does not accurately reflect the fact that the LL.B. is a professional as well as a post-baccalaureate degree." In 2009, the Pamantasan ng Lungsod ng Maynila (PLM) and the Silliman University College of Law also shifted their respective LL.B programs to Juris Doctor, applying the change to incoming freshmen students for School Year 2009–2010. The newly established De La Salle University College of Law is likewise offering the J.D., although it will offer the program using a trimestral calendar, unlike the model curriculum that uses a semestral calendar.

Singapore
The degree of Doctor of Jurisprudence is offered at all three law schools in Singapore, which also offer LL.B. degrees. It is treated as a qualifying law degree for the purposes of admission to the legal profession in Singapore. A graduate of these programmes is a "qualified person" under Singapore's legislation governing entry to the legal profession, and is eligible for admission to the Singapore Bar.

United Kingdom
The Quality Assurance Agency consulted in 2014 on the inclusion of "Juris Doctor" in the U.K. Framework for Higher Education Qualifications as an exception to the rule that "doctor" should only be used by doctoral degrees. It was proposed that the Juris Doctor would be an award at bachelor level, and would not confer the right to use the title "doctor". This was not incorporated into the final framework published in 2014.

The only J.D. degree currently awarded by a U.K. university is at Queen's University Belfast. This is a 3–4 year degree specified as being a professional doctorate at the doctoral qualifications level in the U.K. framework, sitting above the LL.M. and including a 30,000 word dissertation demonstrating the "creation and interpretation of new knowledge, through original research or other advanced scholarship, of a quality to satisfy peer review, extend the forefront of the discipline, and merit publication".

Joint LL.B./J.D. courses for a very limited number of students are offered by University College London, King's College London, and the London School of Economics in collaboration with Columbia University in the U.S. King's also offers a joint LLB/JD with Georgetown University. These are four-year, undergraduate courses leading to the award of both a British LL.B. and a U.S. J.D. King's College London and the University of Exeter offer joint LLB/JD degrees with the Chinese University of Hong Kong, with two years in the UK followed by two years in Hong Kong.

Harvard Law School in the US and University of Cambridge in the UK offer a J.D./LL.M. Joint Degree Program enabling Harvard J.D. candidates to earn a Cambridge LL.M. and a Harvard J.D. in 3.5 years.

The University of Southampton offers a two-year graduate-entry LL.B. described as a "J.D. pathway" degree, while the University of Law offers various "LLB Canadian JD Pathways" within its undergraduate LLB programs to prepare students for a Canadian JD. The University of Surrey previously offered a course similar to Southampton's. 

The University of York offers a three-year  "LL.M. Law (Juris Doctor)" degree intended for those looking at an international career in law. This is formally a Master of Laws (LL.M.) degree, but it is marketed as a J.D.

In academia
In the United States, the Juris Doctor is the degree that prepares the recipient to enter the law profession (as do the M.D. or D.O. in the medical profession and the D.D.S or D.M.D. in the dental profession). While the J.D. is the sole degree necessary to become a professor of law or to obtain a license to practice law, it (like the M.D., D.O, D.D.S, or D.M.D.) is not a "research degree".

Research degrees in the study of law include the Master of Laws (LL.M.), which ordinarily requires the J.D. as a prerequisite, and the Doctor of Juridical Science (S.J.D. / J.S.D.), which ordinarily requires the LL.M. as a prerequisite.  

However, the American Bar Association, which accredits US law schools, has issued a Council Statement stating: WHEREAS, the acquisition of a Doctor of Jurisprudence degree requires from 84 to 90 semester hours of post baccalaureate study and the Doctor of Philosophy degree usually requires 60 semester hours of post baccalaureate study along with the writing of a dissertation, the two degrees shall be considered as equivalent degrees for educational employment purposes.

Accordingly, while most law professors are required to conduct original writing and research in order to be awarded tenure, the majority have a J.D. as their highest degree and are qualified to teach and supervise LL.M. and J.S.D candidates. However, research in 2015 showed an increasing trend toward hiring professors with both J.D. and Ph.D. degrees, particularly at more highly ranked schools.
Professor Kenneth K. Mwenda criticized the council's statement, pointing out that it compares the J.D. only to the taught component of the Ph.D. degree in the U.S., ignoring the research and dissertation components.

The United States Department of Education Center for Education Statistics classifies the J.D. and other professional doctorates as "doctor’s degree-professional practice." It classifies the Ph.D. and other research doctorates as "doctor’s degree-research/scholarship." Among legal degrees, it accords the latter status only to the Doctor of Juridical Science degree.

In Europe, the European Research Council follows a similar policy, stating that a professional degree carrying the title "doctor" is not considered equivalent to a research degree, such as a Ph.D. The Dutch and Portuguese National Academic Recognition Information Centres both classify the J.D. granted in the U.S. (along with other professional doctorate degrees) as equivalent to a master's degree, while the National Qualifications Authority of Ireland states with respect to U.S. practice that: "The '... professional degree' is a first degree, not a graduate degree, even though it incorporates the word 'doctor' in the title"

Commonwealth countries also often consider the J.D. granted in the U.S. equivalent to a bachelor's degree, even though the U.S. Citizenship and Immigration Services has advised that "while neither degree is likely equivalent to a Ph.D., a J.D., or M.D. degree would be considered to be equivalent to, if not higher than, a masters degree".

Use of the title "doctor"
It has been contrary to custom in the United States to address holders of the J.D. as "doctor". It was noted in the 1920s, when the title was widely used by people with doctorates (even those that were undergraduate qualifications, at the time) and others, that the J.D. stood apart from other doctorates in this respect. This continues to be the case in general today.

In the late 1960s, the rising number of American law schools awarding J.D.s led to debate over whether lawyers could ethically use the title 'doctor'. Initial informal ethics opinions, based on the Canons of Professional Ethics then in force, came down against this. These were then reinforced with a full ethics opinion that maintained the ban on using the title in legal practice, as a form of self-laudation (except when dealing with countries where the use of "doctor" by lawyers was standard practice), but allowed the use of the title in academia "if the school of graduation thinks of the J.D. degree as a doctor's degree". These opinions only led to more debate.

The introduction of the 1969 Code of Professional Responsibility seemed to settle the question in favour of allowing the use of the title – in those states where the code was adopted. There was some dispute over whether only the Ph.D.-level Doctor of Juridical Science should properly be seen as granting the title, but ethics opinions made it clear that the new Code allowed J.D.-holders to be called 'doctor', while reaffirming that the older Canons did not.

As not all state bars adopted the new code, and some omitted the clause permitting the use of the title, confusion over whether lawyers could ethically use the title "doctor" continued. While many state bars now allow the use of the title, some prohibit its use where there is any chance of confusing the public about a lawyer's actual qualifications (e.g. if the public might be left with the impression that the lawyer is a doctor of medicine). There has been discussion on whether it is permissible in some other limited instances. For example, in June 2006, the Florida Bar Board of Governors ruled that a lawyer could refer to himself as a "doctor en leyes" (doctor in laws) in a Spanish-language advertisement, reversing an earlier decision. The decision was reversed again in July 2006, when the board voted to only allow the names of degrees to appear in the language used on the diploma, without translation.

The Wall Street Journal notes specifically in its stylebook that "Lawyers, despite their J.D. degrees, aren't called doctor", although the title is used (if preferred, and if appropriate in context) for "individuals who hold Ph.D.s and other doctoral degrees" and for "those who are generally called 'doctor' in their professions in the U.S." Many other newspapers reserve the title for physicians only or do not use titles at all. In 2011, Mother Jones published an article claiming that Michele Bachmann was misrepresenting her qualifications by using the "bogus" title "Dr.", based solely on her J.D. They later amended the article to note that the use of the title by lawyers "is a (begrudgingly) accepted practice in some states and not in others", although they maintained that it was rarely used as it "suggests that you're a medical doctor or a Ph.D. – and therefore conveys a false level of expertise."

See also
 Bachelor of Civil Law (B.C.L., LL.B., or LL.L.)
 Bachelor of Laws (LL.B.)
 Doctor of Canon Law (J.C.D.)
 Doctor of Juridical Science (J.S.D. or S.J.D.)
 Doctor of Laws (LL.D.)
 Master of Laws (LL.M.)
 Legal education
 Admission to practice law
 Accelerated JD program
 Law degree
 Law school in the United States – describes general characteristics of the J.D. curriculum in the U.S.
 Lawyer

Notes

References

External links

Law degrees
Law degrees